The UEFA Women's Euro 2013 qualifying – Group 1 was contested by six teams competing for one spot for the final tournament.

Standings

Results
All times are UTC+2.

Game ended originally 0–2 before it was awarded a default victory in favor of Russia.

Goalscorers
9 goals
 Patrizia Panico

7 goals
 Lidija Kuliš

6 goals
 Anna Żelazko

5 goals

 Pamela Conti
 Melania Gabbiadini
 Elisa Camporese
 Elena Morozova
 Natalia Shlyapina

4 goals

 Daniela Sabatino
 Olesya Mashina
 Olga Petrova

3 goals

 Gentjana Rochi
 Sandra Sałata
 Agnieszka Winczo
 Nelli Korovkina

2 goals

 Vasilikas Moskofidou
 Dimitra Panteliadou
 Alice Parisi
 Raffaella Manieri
 Ekaterina Sochneva

1 goal

 Amela Fetahović
 Amela Kršo
 Moira Murić
 Nejra Šabić
 Alisa Spahić
 Maria Mitkou
 Anastasia Papadopoulou
 Danai-Eleni Sidira
 Giulia Domenichetti
 Elisabetta Tona
 Sandy Iannella
 Natasha Andonova
 Afrodita Salihi
 Patrycja Balcerzak
 Donata Leśnik
 Marta Stobba
 Elena Medved
 Natalia Pertseva
 Elena Terekhova

References
Group 1

1
2011–12 in Italian women's football
2012–13 in Italian women's football
2011–12 in Polish football
2012–13 in Polish football
2011–12 in Bosnia and Herzegovina football
2012–13 in Bosnia and Herzegovina football
2011–12 in Russian football
2012–13 in Russian football
2011–12 in Republic of Macedonia football
2012–13 in Republic of Macedonia football
2011–12 in Greek football
2012–13 in Greek football
qualifying